Baeolidia cryoporos is a deep-water species of sea slug, an aeolid nudibranch. It is a marine gastropod mollusc in the family Aeolidiidae.

Distribution

Description
Baeolidia cryoporos is distinguished from other known Baeolidia species by living in deep, cold water and having no eyes.

References

Aeolidiidae
Gastropods described in 1977